Wiarton Keppel International Airport, or Wiarton Airport , is located  east of Wiarton, Ontario, Canada.

It is classified as an airport of entry by the Canada Border Services Agency on a call out basis from the Waterloo International Airport on weekdays and the John C. Munro Hamilton International Airport on weekends during the summer months for general aviation aircraft with no more than 15 passengers. It serves as an important part of the overall infrastructure for the Bruce Peninsula. The airport is used for training purposes from many flight schools throughout Ontario. The town of Wiarton and the famous Bruce Caverns are easily accessible from the airport. The Bruce Trail is located on the northern portion of the airport.

Services
Aviation fuel, both 100LL and Jet A are available during published hours and for after hours call outs at a cost.

Airlines and destinations

References

External links

Certified airports in Ontario
Transport in Bruce County
Buildings and structures in Bruce County